Rajko Kuzmanović (born 1 December 1931) is a Bosnian Serb politician in Bosnia and Herzegovina. He served as President of the Republic of Srpska from 7 December 2007 to 15 November 2010.

He succeeded the Acting President Igor Radojičić. Kuzmanović won the election against Ognjen Tadić of the Serbian Democratic Party with 41.33% of the vote.

External links 
Official biography

 

 

1931 births
Living people
People from Čelinac
Serbs of Bosnia and Herzegovina
Alliance of Independent Social Democrats politicians